Richard Joseph Bloomfield (August 27, 1927 – November 22, 2011) was a career Foreign Service Officer who served as United States Ambassador to Ecuador (1976–1978) and United States Ambassador to Portugal (1978–1982). After retiring from the US Foreign Service in 1982 he became executive director of the World Peace Foundation (1982–1992).

Career
After graduating from the Edmund A. Walsh School of Foreign Service in 1950 and serving in the US Air Force, Bloomfield joined the US Foreign Service in 1952. As well as various postings in Latin America he was Director of the Office of Policy Planning and Coordination at the Bureau of Inter-American Affairs (1973 - 1976), before being appointed United States Ambassador to Ecuador (1976 - 1978) and United States Ambassador to Portugal (1978 - 1982).

After retiring from the US Foreign Service in 1982 Bloomfield became executive director of the World Peace Foundation (1982 - 1992), before becoming a senior visiting fellow at Brown University.

References

1927 births
2011 deaths
Walsh School of Foreign Service alumni
Ambassadors of the United States to Ecuador
Ambassadors of the United States to Portugal
United States Foreign Service personnel
Harvard Kennedy School alumni